The Digital Trust Center is a Dutch organisation, with the main goal to help entrepreneurs with safe digital entrepreneurship.

The organisation is an initiative of the Ministry of Economic Affairs and Climate Policy and is supported by the Confederation of Netherlands Industry and Employers (VNO-NCW), the Royal Association MKB-Nederland), the National Coordinator for Security and Counterterrorism, the National Cyber Security Centre / Platform for the Information Society, Platform Netherlands, NLdigital, and the Dutch Chamber of Commerce.

Target group 
The Digital Trust Center's target group consists of 2.2 million companies: from freelancers to large companies. These are all companies in the Netherlands that do not belong to the so-called vital sectors, such as banks, telecom, energy and water companies. Companies in these vital sectors have the National Cyber Security Centre as a partner within the central government.

Mission 
The Dutch Trust Centers mission is to increase the resilience of businesses to cyber threats with a focus on two key tasks. Its first
task is to provide businesses with reliable and independent information on digital vulnerabilities and concrete advice on the action they should take, by means of a digital platform and other facilities. Its second task is to foster cyber security alliances between businesses. Both tasks aim to help businesses improve their cyber security arrangements and to increase their resilience to cyber threats.

External links 
  Digital Trust Center

References 

Cybercrime